The JIHOSTROJ a.s., based in Velesin, Czech Republic, is a company that manufactures hydraulic and aircraft fuel pumps, as well as other components for automotive and aircraft industry. Particularly the FCU, Propeller governor and main fuel pump for Walter M601 turboprop engines. Jihostroj is the majority owner of Jawa Moto company.

History

Between World Wars
The company was founded by Jan Hans, in 1919 to produce electrotechnical equipment.

From 1936 the company started the manufacture in area of aircraft industry.

World War II

During World War II Jihostroj was forced to produce for German war aircraft industry.

after World War II

The Jihostroj plant survived the war intact and in 1946 the company was nationalized and joined with PAL n.e. In 1952 was the National enterprise Jikov included into Motorlet n.e. at Prague.

In 1953 was JIKOV separated again and a new subject was created called JIHOceske STROJirny - JIHOSTROJ with the main production program, oriented to aerospace industry.

after Velvet Revolution in 1989

In 1992, the company was privatised into joint stock company JIHOSTROJ a.s.. The main reorganization was completed in 1995. The company was divided into two basic division - Aerospace Division, and Hydraulic Division. The orientation of the company was directed towards high quality and effectiveness.

Current situation

List of current products applications made by Aerospace Division of Jihostroj a.s.:

Turboprop engine  M601 GE Aviation Czech (Walter) 
One of main current Jihostroj Aerospace Division products are devices equipping turboprop engine M601 Walter. E.g. Fuel control unit LUN 6590, Main fuel pump LUN 6290 and propeller governor LUN 7816.

APU Saphire 
For APU of type line Saphire Jihostroj a.s. supplies:
Fuel Pump 
Oil Pump 
Fuel Distributor 
Oil Distributor 
This APU is used in various modifications on the following aircraft Aero L-39, Aero L-159, K-8, L15, Helicopter Mi17.

Propeller Governors 
All kinds of aircraft with piston engine and constant speed propeller. RVs, Extra 300, Pitts, Sukhoi Su-31, and others. Complete list, see in External links.

Break cylinder subassemblies 
For military training aircraft Pilatus PC-21 for single engine turboprop passenger and cargo aircraft Pilatus PC-12, as well as helicopter Sikorsky S-76 a businessjet Eclipse 500 Jihostroj supplies Break cylinder subassemblies.

Others 
Jihostroj also supplies assemblies and parts for:
Engine RR Trent 800, 1000, Cessna 550, and others

References

External links
 Official web page of Jihostroj a.s.
 List of Jihostroj propeller governor PCU5000 STC (PMA) applications

Aircraft manufacturers of the Czech Republic and Czechoslovakia
Manufacturing companies established in 1919
Czech brands
1919 establishments in Czechoslovakia